Vizzy Stadium is a cricket team in Vizianagram, Andhra Pradesh. The stadium hosted three first-class matches  in 1995 when Andhra cricket team played against Tamil Nadu cricket team.

The stadium hosted five List A matches  in 1995 when Andhra cricket team played against Tamil Nadu cricket team since then the ground has hosted some non-first-class matches.

References

External links 
 cricketarchive
 cricinfo
 Wikimapia

Cricket grounds in Andhra Pradesh
Vizianagaram
1995 establishments in Andhra Pradesh
Sports venues completed in 1995
Buildings and structures in Vizianagaram district
Uttarandhra
20th-century architecture in India